John Shipley may refer to:
John Shipley (poker player) (born c. 1960), English poker player
John Shipley, Baron Shipley, politician
John Shipley, former musician in The Specials
John Shipley, character in the film  The Stone Angel

See also

Jonathan Shipley, English bishop in Wales